Amar Deep may refer to:

 Amar Deep (1979 film), a Bollywood film
 Amardeep (1958 film), a Bollywood film
 Amar Kaleka (born 1978), full name Amardeep Singh Kaleka
 Amardeep Jha (born 1960), Indian actress

See also 
 Amara Deepam (1956 film), a Tamil film
 Amara Deepam (1977 film), a Telugu film